"Mrs. Steven Rudy" is a song co-written and recorded by American country music artist Mark McGuinn for his debut self-titled album. It was released as the album's first single in January 2001 and peaked at No. 6 on the U.S. country charts.  It also reached No. 44 on the Billboard Hot 100. It was his highest peaking single and his only Top 20 single on the country charts. It was also McGuinn's only peaking single on the Hot 100. The song was the highest-selling single on the country singles sales charts for five consecutive weeks in mid-2001. The song marked the first time in over 40 years a new artist, on an independent label, had obtained at Top 10 hit. McGuinn wrote the song with Shane Decker.

Initially, McGuinn's debut single was to have been "That's a Plan," but after a disc jockey at KPLX in Texas began playing "Mrs. Steven Rudy," its large positive audience response prompted that song to be chosen as McGuinn’s first release instead.

Personnel
Compiled from Mark McGuinn liner notes.

 Gary Hogue - steel guitar
Don Kerce - bass guitar
Wayne Killius - drums, drum loops
Troy Lancaster - electric guitar
 Mark McGuinn - vocals
Curt Ryle - acoustic guitar
Wanda Vick - banjo
Dennis Wage - piano
Recorded and Mixed by - Jamie Tate
Mastered by - Hank Williams

Music video
The music video was directed by David Abbott.

Chart performance
"Mrs. Steven Rudy" debuted as an official single at number 52 on the U.S. Billboard Hot Country Singles & Tracks for the chart week of February 3, 2001.

Year-end charts

References

2001 songs
2001 debut singles
Mark McGuinn songs
Songs written by Mark McGuinn
Songs about fictional female characters